Yuganthaya (Sinhala: යුගාන්තය "The End of an Era" or "Destiny") is a novel written by Sri Lankan writer Martin Wickremasinghe and first published in 1949. It is the third and last part of Wickramasinghe's trilogy that began with Gamperaliya and followed by Kaliyugaya.

The novel adapted into a movie in 1983 by Lester James Peries.

1949 novels
Sri Lankan historical novels
Novels set in Sri Lanka
Sri Lankan novels adapted into films
Novels by Martin Wickramasinghe